Randy J. Goodwin (born as Ivan Jerome Goodwin on December 24, 1967), is an American actor. He is perhaps best known for his role as "Kennedy Winslow" on Fast Track and "Max Ellis" on the show Abby, as well as his recurring roles on Girlfriends as "Davis Hamilton" and The Vampire Diaries as "Dr. Jonas Martin".

Career
Goodwin was a member of GBT Academy of the Arts Advisory Board, serving as an actor and writer.
Goodwin is set to direct his first full-length feature film in April 2013, a Christian film entitled The Job, written by Steve Lee and Randy Goodwin, with Goodwin set to star as well..

Filmography

Film

Television

References

External links
Randy J. Goodwin Facebook
Randy J. Goodwin LinkedIn
Randy J. Goodwin Twitter Page

1967 births
Living people
Male actors from Omaha, Nebraska
20th-century American male actors
21st-century American male actors
American male film actors
American male television actors